The Wilson Tobs were a minor league baseball club based in Wilson, North Carolina and played periodically between 1908 and 1973. The Tobs nickname was a shortened form of the word "tobacconists". From 1908 to 1910, the team was officially known as the Wilson Tobacconists and played in the Eastern Carolina League. The club won the league's championship in 1909 and they were in the championship series in 1908, when play was suspended due to a tropical storm. They then next spent eight seasons in the Virginia League. During the 1920–1922 and 1924–1927 seasons the team was known as the Wilson Bugs. They won the Virginia League championship in 1922 and 1923. From 1939 to 1952, the renamed Wilson Tobs were also a member of the Class D Coastal Plain League, winning that league's championship in 1941. The 1941 Tobs were recognized as one of the 100 greatest minor league teams of all time. In 1942, the team played in the Bi-State League.

The team also played in the Carolina League from 1956 to 1968, winning the league championship in 1959, 1961, and 1963. The 1966 team had future Hall of Fame member Rod Carew in their line-up. Wilson returned to the Carolina League for one season in 1973 as the Wilson Pennants.

Currently, a summer collegiate baseball team plays at Fleming Stadium as the Wilson Tobs.

Notable Wilson Alumni

Hall of Fame Alumni

 Rod Carew (1966) Inducted, 1990

Notable Alumni

 Ted Abernathy (1973)

 Donn Clendenon (1959) 1969 World Series Most Valuable Player

 Ripper Collins (1923) 3 x MLB All-Star; 1934 NL Home Run Leader

 Jack Fisher (1958)

 Jimmie Hall (1957) 2 x MLB All-Star

 Pat Kelly (1964-1965) MLB All-Star

 Jack McKeon (1960-1961, MGR) Manager: 2003 World Series Champion - Florida Marlins

 Charlie Manuel (1965-1966) Manager: 2008 World Series Champion - Philadelphia Phillies

 George Mitterwald (1966)

 William D. Mullins (1957) member of the Massachusetts House of Representatives

 Cal Ripken (1958)

 Rich Rollins (1960) 2 x MLB All-Star

 Lee Stange (1960)

 Bob Veale (1959) 2 x MLB All-Star; threw a no-hitter for Wilson in 1959

Seasons

References

Baseball teams established in 1908
Defunct minor league baseball teams
Professional baseball teams in North Carolina
Pittsburgh Pirates minor league affiliates
Minnesota Twins minor league affiliates
Washington Senators minor league affiliates
Baltimore Orioles minor league affiliates
Philadelphia Phillies minor league affiliates
Carolina League teams
1908 establishments in North Carolina
1973 disestablishments in North Carolina
Wilson, North Carolina
Defunct baseball teams in North Carolina
Bi-State League teams
Baseball teams disestablished in 1973
Eastern Carolina League teams
Coastal Plain League (minor league) teams